The 2017 Liga 3 Riau Islands is the third edition of Liga 3 Riau Islands, as a qualifying round for the 2017 Liga 3. 

The competition starts on 26 August 2017.

Teams
There are six clubs which will participate the league in this season. Matches were played at Tumenggung Abdul Jamal Stadium, Batam.

References 

2017 in Indonesian football
Sport in Riau Islands